Penicillium molle is an anamorph species of the genus Penicillium.

References 

molle
Fungi described in 1980